Eschbach may refer to:

Places

France 
Eschbach, Bas-Rhin, in the department Bas-Rhin
Eschbach-au-Val, in the department Haut-Rhin

Germany 
Eschbach, Baden-Württemberg, in the Breisgau-Hochschwarzwald district, Baden-Württemberg
Eschbach, Rhein-Lahn, in the Rhein-Lahn-Kreis, Rhineland-Palatinate
Eschbach, Südliche Weinstraße, in the Südliche Weinstraße district, Rhineland-Palatinate
Eschbach (Usingen), a borough of Usingen
Nieder-Eschbach (Frankfurt am Main), a borough of Frankfurt

United States 
Eschbach, Washington

Rivers

Eschbach (Nidda), a river of Hesse, Germany, tributary of the Nidda
Eschbach (Usa), a river of Hesse, Germany, tributary of the Usa
Eschbach (Siede), a river of Lower Saxony, Germany, tributary of the Siede
Eschbach (Wupper), a river of North Rhine-Westphalia, Germany, tributary of the Wupper

People with the surname
Andreas Eschbach (born 1959), German writer
Joseph W. Eschbach (1933–2007), kidney specialist whose research led to the treatment of anemia

See also
 Eschenbach (disambiguation)